John Stoddert Haw House is a historic building, located at 2808 N Street, Northwest, Washington, D.C., in the Georgetown neighborhood.

History
The building was constructed in 1816, and is an example of Federal architecture.

In 1815, it was bought by Benjamin Stoddert's nephew, John Stoddert Haw. On July 19, 1817, it was assessed for US$5,000.

In  1921, United States Navy Rear Admiral Spencer S. Wood bought the house. After his death in 1940, it passed in 1941 to his daughter Anne Elizabeth Wood Harsch, who was married to Joseph C. Harsch.

In  1962, Chester Bowles bought the house. In  1967, George C. McGhee bought it.

The house is listed on the National Register of Historic Places, and is a contributing property to the Georgetown Historic District. Its 2009 property value was $2,935,970.

See also
Isaac Owens House

References

External links
 

Houses on the National Register of Historic Places in Washington, D.C.
Individually listed contributing properties to historic districts on the National Register in Washington, D.C.
Houses completed in 1816
Georgetown (Washington, D.C.)